The Henry-Thompson House is a historic house at 302 SE Second Street in Bentonville, Arkansas.  It is a two-story brick building, with Italianate styling that includes trusswork in the front-facing gable, a scrollwork balustrade on the main porch, and scrolled brackets on a hood over a secondary entrance.  Built in 1890, this is a good representative of late Italianate style brick homes that were built in significant numbers in Bentonville between 1870 and 1895.

The house was listed on the National Register of Historic Places in 1988.

See also
National Register of Historic Places listings in Benton County, Arkansas

References

Houses on the National Register of Historic Places in Arkansas
Italianate architecture in Arkansas
Houses completed in 1890
Houses in Bentonville, Arkansas
National Register of Historic Places in Bentonville, Arkansas
1890 establishments in Arkansas